Nathaniel Boyse  was an Irish politician.

Boyse was born in Wexford and educated at Trinity College, Dublin. From 1692 until 1714, he was MP for Bannow.

References

Alumni of Trinity College Dublin
Members of the Parliament of Ireland (pre-1801) for County Carlow constituencies
Irish MPs 1692–1693
Irish MPs 1695–1699
Irish MPs 1703–1713
Irish MPs 1713–1714
People from Wexford, County Wexford